Forset is a village in Gausdal Municipality in Innlandet county, Norway. Forset was the administrative centre of the former municipality of Vestre Gausdal, which existed until 1962 when it became a part of Gausdal Municipality. Vestre Gausdal Church is located in the village.

References

Gausdal
Villages in Innlandet